Leslie Boardman (2 August 1889 – 23 November 1975) was an Australian freestyle swimmer of the 1910s.  As a member of the Australasia combined team of Australia and New Zealand athletes, Boardman won a gold medal in the 4×200-metre freestyle relay at the 1912 Summer Olympics in Stockholm.

Although little is known about Boardman, he never won any Australian championships and was not among the original selections for the 1912 Olympics.  E.G. Findlay was originally named in the team, but presumably due to lack of financing, Boardman later assumed his position in the team.  According to records, he did not place at the 1912 Australian Championships and came fourth in the 220-yard freestyle at the New South Wales Championships.  It is hypothesized that he was chosen because he was a teammate at the Sydney Swimming Club of Harold Hardwick and Cecil Healy.

Boardman competed in the 100-metre freestyle at the Stockholm Olympics where he won his heat, but came fourth in the second round and was eliminated.  In the 4×200-metre freestyle relay, he swam the third leg as the team of Hardwick (Australia), Healy (Australia) and Malcolm Champion (New Zealand) defeated the United States team for the gold medal.  He was also signed up to compete at plain high diving competition, but did not compete.

See also 
 List of Olympic medalists in swimming (men)
 World record progression 4 × 200 metres freestyle relay

References

Sources
 
 
 Database Olympics

1889 births
1975 deaths
Swimmers from Sydney
Olympic swimmers of Australasia
Swimmers at the 1912 Summer Olympics
Olympic gold medalists for Australasia
World record setters in swimming
Medalists at the 1912 Summer Olympics
Australian male freestyle swimmers
Olympic gold medalists in swimming